Yasmin and the Serpent Prince is a Persian folktale published in 1974 by author Forough Hekmat. It is related to the international cycle of the Animal as Bridegroom or The Search for the Lost Husband, in that a human princess marries a supernatural husband or man in animal form, loses him and has to seek him out.

Summary
Long time ago, in a Persian city, a merchant named Hajji Muhammad lives with his five daughters, the youngest, named Yasmin, the one he loves best of all. One day, he has to go on a journey, and asks his daughters what they want as gifts. The four elders want extravagant garments and shoes, but the youngest asks for a clustered bunch of grape-like pearls and a starred, two-pointed diamond.

Hajji Muhammad goes on his journey and, after doing his business, buys the presents for his four elder daughters, but has trouble finding Yasmin's request. His quest is interrupted by a violent storm, so he takes shelter in a castle in the middle of a plain. He enters the castle and notices that the garden is full of silver and gold trees.

This mysterious garden seems like a vision of paradise: flowers made of precious gems, stream of milk and honey flowing from the trees, and many melodies coming from the trees. He ventures deep into the garden and finds the branch of pearls and diamonds. He goes to pluck it, but a roar behind him interrupts his action. The merchant turns around and sees a large snake, of a bright green colour.

The merchant explains to the green snake that the branch is supposed to be a present for his youngest daughter, Yasmin. Noticing that the merchant seems too interested in the branch from his garden, the green snake makes a deal with him: he shall get the branch, but, in return, his youngest daughter is to be given to the serpent as his wife. The merchant is a bit alarmed by the proposal about his daughter, about any potential danger. The snake assuages his fears and they seal a written pact.

The merchant returns home with the branch, jewels and presents for his daughters. Time passes, and he forgets about his promise to the snake, until one day, a knock is heard at the door. It is the snake, come to take his wife, as promised. The merchant goes inside to tell Yasmin about his promise. Yasmin agrees that promises must be kept, but, hoping to delay - and even discourage - the snake about the marriage proposal, she says the snake must prepare a feast for 40 days, where the finest dishes and drinks are to be served, and every guest must be showered with gems.

The animal agrees with the conditions and takes a three day leave for wedding preparations. The snake returns after three days on a golden coach and takes them to the wedding feast, in the same garden where Hajji Muhammad found the pearl-and-diamond branch. Yasmin, the bride, stays silent all the time.

After the feast ends and the guests rest, the snake and Yasmin retire to a spacious apartment. Yasmin, then, breaks her silence and asks the snake about his true identity, since it cannot be a mere animal, due to his magical powers. The serpent makes her promise not to tell his secret, and, casting a spell on himself, sheds its snakeskin. He reveals that he is Prince Baharam, son of the Shah of Demons, who has come from the World of Darkness to the world of man, interested in the good qualities of human people (justice, learning, love for one another), in contrast to the wickedness and base interests of the demons.

They live as husband and wife for two years, him a snake by day and a prince by night. However, she begins to miss home, and longs to show that her husband is truly human. One day, she asks Baharam about how to destroy his snakeskin. She insists to know and he tells that the skin needs to be burned with shells of pistachio nut. She delights at the answer, but feels torn between keeping his secret and destroying the snakeskin.

Some time later, she decides to visit her family, and her husband warns her not to reveal his secret. Her sisters inquire her about her life in the snake's castle, and a gossiping aunt begins to pry more and more into her life, so much so that she reveals the snake is human underneath. Her aunt suggests she burns the snakeskin, so that he remains human at all times, and gives her some pistachio nuts.

Yasmin goes home to her husband. While Baharam is asleep, she leaves the bed, gets the snakeskin from a chest, and takes it to kitchen to burn it with the shells of pistachio nuts. The next morning, Baharam awakes and asks his wife about the snakeskin. Yasmin answers that she burned it. He despairs at the fact and tells that he needed his scaly disguise, but now he has to return to the Realm of Darkness, back to his people. Yasmin throws herself at his feet and begs for forgiveness. He chastises her, and says that, to find him again, she has to walk towards the West, for 7 years, in 7 iron suits, 7 iron shoes, and with 7 iron canes. Baharam goes to the garden, chants a spell and vanishes, the castle and everything along with him, leaving Yasmin lost in a desert.

Despite the hunger and thirst, Yasmin traverses the desert back to her father's house. He welcomes her and lets her grieve for her lost husband.  After six months, she decides to begin her arduous quest toward the Realm of Darkness. Her father commissions the iron garments and the iron canes, and she sets out. For seven years, she walks and walks, wanders high and low, until the seventh iron dress and the seventh iron shoes are worn, and the seventh iron cane is nothing but a stump in her hands. Tired of the long journey, and not knowing if she has arrived, she lies down to sleep.

After a whole day and night, she wakes up and notices she is in a meadow, full of animals of a black colour. Even the trees and flowers are black, and light does not seem to reach that land. She asks a passing man with black horns on his head whose meadow it is. The horned man says it belongs to Prince Baharam, the son of the Shah of Demons. She goes to drink a bit of the black water, and sees a slave-girl coming to get water.

The slave-girl says she is fetching water for her master, the prince. Yasmin sees a nearby castle made of black stone, and has an idea: she asks for the slave-girl to drink a bit of the water, and drops her wedding ring in it. Inside the castle, the slave-girl drops the water on Prince Baharam's hands and the ring falls out of the jug. He recognizes it and asks the slave-girl if anyone was outside. She says a woman is resting by a tree when she left to fetch water. Baharam goes outside and finds his wife Yasmin. They embrace, after seven long years, and rejoice in each other's presence. Baharam warns her of the danger the demons pose, and suggests he changes her appearance to keep her safe, until they find a chance to escape.

Baharam turns her into a golden needle and brings her home with him to the castle. Despite the magic disguise, the prince's stepmother smells a "Child of Adam" (a human) in their castle. Afraid of being found out, Baharam changes the needle into a broom, then into a piece of wood, and lastly into a spray of flowers to throw her off the human's scent, but to no avail. He then decides to introduce Yasmin to his stepmother, the Queen of Demons, as a weary traveller from the world of man. The queen of demons begrudgingly accepts her as a guest.

The next day, the Queen of Demons gives two pieces of cloth to Yasmin, and orders her to wash the white one black and the black one into white. Baharam chants a spell to change the colours. The next task is for her to fill seven clays jars with a sieve - her husband casts a spell on the sieve to fill the holes. The third task is for her to separate a heap of mixed seeds (wheat, rice, lentils, millet, poppy and vetch) - Baharam summons a swarm of ants to separate the grains.

The last task is for Yasmin to go to the stepmother's sister and get from her the "Give-and-Take-Box". Baharam advises her to compliment a thorny branch by saying it is a rosebush; to compliment a dirty river by saying it is rosewater; to give the animals their correct fodder (straw for the donkeys, bones to the dogs), open all closed doors and shut all open ones in his step-aunt's house, get the box and do not open it, and escape.   Yasmin follows the instructions to the letter, gets a little black box from the step-aunt, and hurries back to the castle of the Queen of Demons. The step-aunt commands the doors, the dogs, the donkeys, the river and the thorns to stop her, but, due to her kind actions, she leaves unscathed.

Now at a safe distance, she tries to peer into the box. The lid opens up and a swarm of flies escape from it. Baharam appears to her, casts a spell and the flies go back to the box. On their journey back to the castle, Baharam tells her that his stepmother planned his wedding to his cousin, and the castle will be swarmed with demons that will kill Yasmin, so they must hurry and escape that night. He then asks her to get them a bag of needles, a box of salt and a jar of water.

That night, the demons are coming to the castle to Baharam's wedding. At midnight, Baharam excuses himself and goes to see Yasmin. They sneak out to the stables and ride his horse away from the castle. The next morning, the Queen of Demons discovers the pair's flight and commands an army of giants to go after them.

Baharam and Yasmin are riding on the prince's black horse and hear the approach of the giants. Yasmin throws the bag of needles behind them, which turn into a forest of thorns to deter the giants. Next, they throw the box of salt, turning the desert into a sea of salt. Lastle, they pour out the contents of the water jug, and a vast sea appears between them and the coming giants. The pursuers try to cross the sea to get them, but sink and drown in it.

Now safe at last, the prince and Yasmin ride to the city where her father  trades as a merchant, and spend the rest of their lives in happiness.

Analysis

Tale type

The compilers compared the Iranian tale to Armenian tale Habrmani and to the Graeco-Roman myth of Cupid and Psyche, stories that belong to the international cycle of the "Animal Bridegroom". According to Inge Höpfner, Iran registers many ("vielen") variants of the cycle.

In his Catalogue of Persian Folktales, German scholar  classified the tale as his type AaTh 425B, Der Tierbräutigam: Die böse Zauberin ("The Animal Bridegroom: The Evil Sorceress"). Marzolph's typing corresponds to type ATU 425B, "The Son of the Witch", of the international Aarne-Thompson-Uther Index. Type 425B is considered by scholarship to correspond to the ancient Graeco-Roman myth of Cupid and Psyche, that is, the supernatural husband's mother forces the heroine, her daughter-in-law, to perform difficult and impossible tasks for her.

Motifs
One of the heroine's tasks is to sort out a heap of mixed grains. According to Swedish scholar , this motif appears in Mediterranean and Near Eastern variants of type ATU 425B, "The Witch's Tasks".

The heroine and her supernatural husband escape in a Magic Flight sequence, that is, the characters either throw magic objects to delay their pursuers, or change into other forms to deceive them. Although this episode is more characteristic of tale type ATU 313, "The Magic Flight", some variants of type ATU 425B also show it as a closing episode. German literary critic Walter Puchner argues that the motif attached itself to type 425B, as a Wandermotiv ("Wandering motif").

Variants

Iran

Bibinegar and Maysaskabar
In a Persian tale published by professor  with the title "Бибинегар и Майсаскабар" ("Bibinegar and Maysaskabar"), a childless woman promises her unborn child to a tree stump. A girl is born and given the name Bibinegar. A voice emerges from the tree stump to remind her mother to give what it is owed. Bibinegar cries but decides to sit beside the tree stump. A man comes out of it with a grand retinue, introduces himself as Maysaskabar and gives the girl a coat. He tells her that she can never part with the coat, lest he will disappear. Bibinegar's aunt burns the coat in order to get rid of him and to marry the girl to her son. The man disappears, his only memento a turquoise ring. Bibinegar decides to seek him out, and passes by a flock of sheep, a caravan of camels and a herd of cows - all presents from Maysaskabar to Bibinegar. She reaches a fountain where a boy is getting water. She begs for a drink and the boy refuses, and she curses the water the boy is carrying to become pus and blood. The boy returns to fetch water again and she drops his ring inside it. Maysaskabar notices the ring and gets the maiden to a house of divs. He convinces the divs to take her as a servant. He plans to escape with her that night after he kills the wife he was forced to marry. They escape in a "Magic Flight" sequence as the man's mother-in-law pursues them. She is killed, but lets a drop of blood drip on the ground and become a gazelle. Maysaskabar decides to take the gazelle as a pet, but once he is away the animal attacks Bibinegar. One night, the gazelle becomes human, hides everyone in bottles and prepares a cauldron of boiling water to drop Bibinagar in. Bibinegar tricks the woman and goes to the roof to pray, to buy herself some time, and a fairy appears. The fairy tells the girl to break the bottle Maysaskabar is in. She does and he is released. The man tosses the gazelle into the cauldron, reveals it is all a setup by his aunt and sends Bibinegar with a bottle with his aunt's life inside to his aunt. He advises her to feed the dog and the camel with the correct food, water the garden, clean the rug and the bed, and to delouse his aunt when she asks for it. She follows through with the instructions, slams the aunt's head against the floor and runs away. The dog attacks Maysaskabar's aunt. Bibinegar returns to her beloved, now human.

Sabzkaba and Shakarkhava
In another Iranian variant published by Osmanov, "Сабзкаба и Шакархава" ("Sabzkaba and Shakarkhava"), a poor woodcutter finds a snake near a sack of flour. He wants to kill it, but the snake introduces himself as Sabzkaba ("Green Kaftan"), and wishes to become his son. One day, Sabzkaba asks his father to ask for the hand of the governor's daughter, Shakarkhava. Her father demands his prospective son-in-law arrive with a great wedding retinue. He does and the governor consents to their marriage. Sabzkaba takes off his snake skin and shows himself to his wife as human, warning her that no one must burn his skin, otherwise she might not see him again. One day, Shakarkhava  is visited by her relatives, and one of her sisters burns the snakeskin. Shakarkhava, in despair, sees her husband disappear, so she commissions seven pairs of iron shoes, seven iron dresses and seven iron canes, and goes on a quest for him. She passes by seven springs, where she meets many girls complaining that their father Sabzkaba has disappeared because of Shakarkhava's fault and wishing harm on her. On the seventh spring, she asks for a bit of water to drink and tosses her ring inside the jug. Her husband Sabzkaba recognizes the ring and brings his wife to his house, where he warns her his family is made of divs. He convinces her to suckle on his div mother's breast to warm up to her. The div mother forces her to cry on the floor and sweep it; to wash a black cloth white; and to take a sieve to the div's sister. One day, the div family organizes a wedding and forces both Sabzkaba and Shakarkhava to hold one candle on each of their fingers during the ceremony. Later that night, they kill the wedding couple and escape in a Magic Flight sequence, as they are pursued by Sabzkaba's relatives, his uncle, his father and lastly his mother: they first turn into a broom (him) and a bundle of sticks (her), then into a garden (her) and a garden-keeper (him); thirdly, a mill (her) and a miller (him) and finally into a cypress tree (her) and a dragon coiled around it (him). Sabzkaba mother reaches them and threatens his wife with a sword, but he kills her before she does any harm to the human girl. Marzolph sourced this tale from Khorasan, and, according to Osmanov, the tale was collected in Morad (modern day South Khorasan).

The Akhund
In a variant from Luristan with the title The Akhund (Luri language: Axun), collected from teller Khudâbas of Bahârvand, an akhund finds a cucumber floating in the river, brings it home and eats it. The man becomes pregnant and gives birth to a turtle. After some time, the animal pleads his human father to ask for the hand of the princess in marriage, but the king insists the turtle suitor performs some tasks first. He does and he marries the princess. After the wedding, the turtle husband takes off his turtle shell and becomes a handsome man, but insists to his wife that she can never tell anyone. One day, the human wife wants to visit his family, so he transforms her into a needle, pins it into his hat, becomes a dove and flies away to his relatives. In the case they are found out, the husband instructs the girl to press his mother's breast and to force her to swear on mother's milk and father's pain not to harm her. She does exactly that, but his mother forces her to do impossible tasks: she sends her to his aunt to get a mortar (since his aunt did not make the same oath she has) and to wash a blackboard white. She accomplishes it with her husband's guidance and help. Lastly, the turtle prince's mother betroths her son to another bride and prepares their wedding. The youth tricks his family by killing the bride, and putting his human wife in her place with the false bride's clothes. The couple turn into a pair of doves and escape. His family discovers the body of the false bride and pursue the couple. To distract them, the princess and her husband shapeshift into a calf (her) and a shepherdess (him), and a flower and a tree. Finally, the turtle prince delivers his wife to his father-in-law and becomes a pomegranate growing on the back of his hand, as a final trick on his aunt and mother. The collector noted that The Akhund was essentially "the same [tale] as" the Iranian tale Le Sultan Serpent, also of type ATU 425 and collected from Khorassan by Adrienne Boulvin.

The Serpent Sultan
Researcher Adrienne Boulvin published an Iranian variant from Meched (Mashhad, formerly in the Khorasan province, modern day Razavi Khorasan province). In this tale, titled Le Sultan Serpent ("The Serpent Sultan"), a poor thorn-gatherer lives with his three daughters in a village in Iran. He earns his living by gathering thorns and selling them in the village. One day, the man goes to the desert to gather thorns, when a large serpent appears to him. The serpent introduces himself as "Serpent Sultan", who has fallen in love with the thorn-gatherer's youngest daughter and demands her as his bride, or it will kill the man. The thorn-gatherer returns home and explains the situation to his youngest daughter. She decides to go with the serpent to save her father, and accompanies the serpent to the desert. The serpent guides the girl to a hole; she enters and sees a grand mansion. They live together as husband and wife, but, in the nights, the serpent gives the girl a soporific drink to make her sleep. Some time later, the girl complains to the serpent that she misses her family. The serpent allows her to visit her family, but warns against listening to any words her sisters say. The girl is happy to visit her sisters, who also advise her to avoid drinking the potion she is offered. That night, she returns to the underground mansion and is given the drink. She pretends to drink and, pretending to be asleep, sees that her serpent husband takes off the serpent skin to become a handsome man. The next morning, the girl asks the serpent how to burn his snakeskin. He tells her the skin can be burnt with onion peels and garlic peels, but warns her that if his skin is burnt, she will have to wear seven iron shoes and walk with seven iron canes. In a certain afternoon, while her husband is away, the girl burns the snakeskin. She waits him to return, but he never does, so she goes after him with iron shoes and iron canes.

She walks for years until she comes across a stream flowing through a verdant meadow, and some chickens and roosters nearby. Feeling hungry, she asks a hen-keeper for some eggs, but he refuses her request, on the basis that none shall eat the Serpent Sultan's eggs. She sees some cows nearby and asks the cowherd for some of their milk, but the cowherd also refuses. Finally, the girl sees a maidservant coming to fetch water and asks for some to drink, but the servant refuses. The servant brings the water to her master and tells him about the thirst girl at the fountain, and Serpent Sultan orders the servant to go back and fulfill the girl's request. The servant obeys and gives the girl water to drink, and the girl secretly places her ring inside the water jug. The Serpent Sultan recognizes the ring and brings his wife in. He warns her his family is composed of divs which may devour her once they learn he married a "descendant of Adam" (a human), so he will pass her off as a servant.

Serpent Sultan's div-mother suspects something is amiss with the newest servant, and begins to hound her. First, the div-mother gives the girl a piece of black felt and orders her to wash it white. With her husband's help, the girl delivers a whitened piece to the div-mother. Next, she orders the girl to pay a visit to the div's sister and get a box from her. Serpent Sultan intercepts his wife and advises her how to traverse the way to his aunt: his wife is to close open doors and open closed doors; give the correct fodder for two animals (straw for a camel, bone for a dog); open a closed bed and close an open bed; ask his aunt for the box, then, while the aunt is away in the kitchen with a butcher's knife, the girl is to get the box and escape. The girl follows the instructions to the letter and escapes from the aunt's house with the box, despite the aunt commanding the dog, the camel, the beds and the doors to stop her.

Lastly, the div-mother marries Serpent Sultan to his cousin. As a last task, the div-mother orders the girl to wash the carpet with her tears and sweep it with her eyelashes. The Serpent Sultan also fulfills this task. Later, she orders her to serve as living chandelier for the ceremony, as the div guests eat pieces of her flesh. Serpent Sultan spreads a dough around the girl's body to protect her from the candles and the voracious div-guests. During the ceremony, the Serpent Sultan feels sorry for the girl, seeing her in that state, and decides to escape with her that same night. He kills his cousin, takes the girl, and both ride away on horses. His div-family goes after them; Serpent Sultan throws behind him some needles and prays to God for the desert to be filled with needles. Next, he throws behind a bit of salt, and prays that it covers the whole desert. At last, he throws behind a water jug and creates a lake between him and his wife and the div-family. His div-mother asks him how they can cross the lake. Serpent Sultan replies that they just have to step on the reflection of the moon and the stars on the surface of the lake. The div-family believe his words, step on the lake and sink to the bottom of the lake. Serpent Sultan and the girl return to their mansion and live happily.

The Daughter of the Woodcutter and her Serpent Husband
Russian Iranist  collected in Shiraz a tale he translated as "Дочь дровосека и её жених-змей" ("The Daughter of the Woodcutter and her Serpent Husband"). In this tale, a poor and old woodcutter has three daughters. One day, he prepares to find some firewood, so he takes off his shoes to go to the oven, and when he turns around, a snake is lying on his shoes. The woodcutter asks the snake to get off his shoes, but the snake tells the man to give him one of his daughters. The woodcutter goes back home and tells his daughters about the situation. The elder two refuse to marry the snake, but the youngest offers herself. The snake gives him means to buy better clothes for his daughter; he buys a fine dress, then gives her away to the snake. The snake and the girl go down a tree hole and enter a beautiful patio, then the snake takes off the snakeskin and becomes a handsome youth named Шафѝ Гýли Зард ("Shafi Guli Zard"). Some time later, the nameless heroine wants to visit her family. She goes back home and shows her sisters the belt from her husband's snakeskin kaftan. Her sisters suggest to burn it. The girl returns to her husband and, while he is in the bath, she tries to burn the snakeskin. Her husband smells the burning and stops her actions, warning her that, to find him again, she is to walk in seven pairs of iron shoes.

Some days later, the girl repeats her action: she throws the snakeskin in the fireplace and burns it. Shafi Guli Zard comes out of the bath and tells his wife that they will be separated now. Suddenly, an eagle flies into the patio, and says that Shafi Guli Zard's aunt awaits for him. The youth jumps onto the eagle's wings and flies bacl to his aunt. When he arrives, his aunt tells him she expects him to marry a person named "Фатма Ханум" (Fatma-Khanum). Shafi Guli Zard chooses to follow his aunt's orders, since she is a div and might eat him.

Meanwhile, his wife, who has been following the eagle's shadow, reaches the castle of Shafi Guli Zard's aunt and cries a bit near a fountain, when she sees a servant fetching water. She asks for some and drops her ring into the jar. Her husband takes her in and passes her off as another maid. She is given the mocking name of Fatma-Pleshak, and made to be the servant of the false bride. Shafi's aunt takes the girl to a yard and orders her to water the yard with her tears. She goes to Shafi to tell him about the task. Her husband reproaches her, but prays to God and invokes Solomon's help to command a wind to sweep the floor and a cloud to rain on the yard. Next, the div-aunt gives a shater to the girl and orders her to wash it in the oven until it becomes white. Shafi repeats his magic command and fulfills the task.

Lastly, the girl is to go to the house of the div-aunt's sister and ask for the self-cutting scissors and the self-playing tambourine. Her husband instructs her to compliment the crooked and twisted scenery on the way there, and to give the animals their correct food. Finally, his aunt sets the heroine as candleholder to Shafi Guli Zard's wedding to Fatma-Khanum. She cries out that her hands are burning, and Shafi Guli Zard answers that his own body is burning. After the ceremony, his aunt conspires with her sister to devour the human girl, Fatma-Pleshak, the next morning. Shafi Guli Zard and the false bride enter the bridal chambers. At midnight, he puts some cotton on the wedding bells to muffle them, goes to Fatma-Pleshak (his true wife) and they escape in the dark of night.

The div aunt and her sister devour the wrong person, and the wedding bells alert them that the couple have escaped. They race after the couple to enact their revenge. Back to the couple, as soon as they see the divs after them, Shafi Guli Zard prays to God and calls out to Solomon for a forest of thorns to appear behind them to hurt their pursuers, then a salt swamp and for the salt to penetrate their wounds, and finally for a vast sea to appear behind them to separate the couple from their pursuers. After the sea appears, the divs on the other side ask him how he traversed it. Shafi Guli Zard tells them to place some millstones around their necks and to wade until they reach the other margin. The divs take the millstones, enter the sea and sink to the bottom. Shafi Guli Zard stays a bit longer to check if they indeed drowned; murky, dirty water begins to pool at the surface. Shafi Guli Zard and his wife celebrate that their pursuers are no more and return home.

Literary versions
Author Behzad Sohrabi published the tale The Man in Green Robe, retold from an "ancient fairy tale of Iran", with similar plot points. In this tale, the king prepares a suitor selection test with his daughters: each is to take a trained falcon and release it; wherever it lands, if there is a suitor nearby, she is to marry him. Princess Golnar, the third and youngest daughter of the king, releases hers and it flies beyond the castle's walls, to a desolate place. She releases it twice again and it still lands in the same place. She eventually marries a mysterious "Man in Green Robe". After the wedding, he warns her against a prohibition imposed on him. She disobeys, he disappears and she has to find him in a distant city, by wearing down seven pairs of iron shoes and carrying an iron cane. When she reaches her destination, she meets her mother-in-law, and begs her to promise not to harm her on her son's name. Her husband, the Man in Green Robe, is set to be married to his cousin, and her mother-in-law forces her to do some chores for her, including bearing a letter to his aunt with a command to kill the princess. Before Golnar visits the woman, her husband intercepts her and exchanges the letter for another with a request for a pair of "scissors that cut and sew by themselves". Having failed the first time, the mother sends her again with another letter, and again the Man in Green Robe replaces the command with a simple request for a musical instrument ("the tambourine that sings and dances"). As his wedding ceremony approaches, the Man in Green Robe dispatches his human wife to the wilderness and instructs her to wait for him with ten candles on her fingers, while he deals with the false bride. After ruining his wedding, he meets Golnar and they escape from his parents by transforming into different things. After the dust settles, they regain human form and create a kingdom for themselves with his magic powers. Some time later, his father-in-law visits them and names Golnar's husband as his successor.

Other regions

Dagestan

Lezgin people
In a variant from the Lezgin people titled "Сад-Эскендер" ("Sad-Eskender"), collected in Dagestan, a poor man lives with his three daughters, Gul-Khanum, Guzel-Khanum and Tavat-Khanum. One day, he goes to the open fields and says his prayers there, when a snake slithers from beneath a stone and asks to marry one of the man's daughters. The man returns home and tells his daughters about it, the elder two cursing their father for a preposterous proposal, but the youngest, Tavat-Khanum, agrees to become the snake's wife. Serpents come to take the girl to their master and descend a hole to a chamber. She waits there for her spouse and the snake comes. The snake asks the girl to step lightly on its skin; a human youth appears and reveals his name is Sad-Eskender. They live as a married couple for some time, until one day, Tavat-Khanum meets an old woman. The woman tells the girl to ask her husband how to burn his snakeskin. Tavat-Khanum does exactly that twice, and is slapped each time. The third time, Sad-Eskender suspects his wife might destroy the skin and warns her against it, but reveals it can be burned in onion peels. The girl burns it and her husband disappears. She wanders for three years in search for him, until she stops by a spring, where three women are fetching water. The girl asks for some water, the youngest woman gives her a jug to drink from and Tavat-Khanum drops her ring in it. Inside a nearby house, Sad-Eskender finds the ring and orders the woman to bring Tavat-Khanum in. Sad-Eskender explains that the house belongs to an azhdaha who wants to marry him to her daughter, and thus Tavat-Khanum becomes her servant. They escape on a magical horse in the dark of night. The next day, the azhdaha knocks on her daughter's room, sees her dead body and notices that Sad-Eskender escaped with the servant. The azhdaha mounts a horse and goes after the pair. The couple throws the objects behind them, the razors, the salt and the barley becoming mountains, but the azhdaha passes through the obstacles. Lastly, they throw the jug of water, which becomes a vast lake before them. With their magical horses, the couple flies over the lake to the other margin. Azhdaha arrives at the lake and tries to ride her horse across it, but they sink to the bottom. The couple reaches a city and Sad-Eskender leaves Tavat-Khanum in the cemetery, while he looks for a job. After some misadventures, they find each other again and live happily.

Kumyk people
In a variant from the Kumyks, collected in Dagestan with the Kumyk title "Йыланхан" (transliteration: "Yılankhan"), an old man has three daughters and goes to the mosque to pray ("namaz", in the original text). One day, after his prayers, the man goes to put on his shoes and finds a curled up serpent in one of them. The man tries to shoo the animal away, but the serpent demands one of the man's daughters. The man goes home and talks to his three daughters about it: the elder two refuse to have a snake for a husband, but the youngest agrees to be the snake's bride. The snake tells the man he will be at a shabby barn at the edge of the village, and his future bride shall come there after dark. Once there, the girl fears the snake, but the animal takes off its skin and becomes a handsome man, and the barn changes into a palace. The next morning, the man gives the girl a golden ring and turns back into a snake, and warns her not to tell her sisters about the secret hole. After he leaves, the palace turns back into a barn. One day, her sisters visit her and are told everything. Now, jealous of the youngest's good fortune, they prepare a trap for the snake bridegroom the next time they meet: both women hide some blades near the hole through which the snake slithers. He comes through the hole, but is hurt by the blades. Badly injured, he disappears from view. The next day, the girl sees the blood and the blades and remembers his warning. She then decides to seek him out. After a long search, the maiden reaches a fountain, where two maidservants come to fetch water for their master, the Serpent King ("Zmey-khan"), who injured himself when he went to the "upper world". The maiden begs for a drink of water, and drops her ring as a token, so that her husband may notice her. The servants take the jug to the Zmey-khan, and he recognizes the ring. He orders the servant to bring the maiden inside the castle, and tells his wife that his family (mother and aunt) are both azhdaha, evil draconic-like beings, and they have set him up with another bride. His mother notices the strange connection between the youth and the maiden, and decides to force her to do chores for her. First, the maiden is to sweep the road between the mother's house and the aunt's. Zmey-khan summons a wind to sweep the road. Next, the maiden is to bring yeast from the aunt's house. Zmey-khan advises his human wife to compliment the thorns and dirty rivers on the way there, to give the correct food to a dog and a horse, take the yeast and flee as soon as possible. At last, the azhdaha family takes the serpent youth to marry the false bride they have chosen for him. He kills the bride, takes his former wife and both escape from the azhdaha family. The creatures go after the pair, and Zmey-khan throws objects behind them to create a dense forest, a salt marsh, and two tall trees. Lastly, he throws behind two spindle heads that he magics to become two millstones to crush his mother and aunt.

Dargin people
In a variant from the Dargins, collected in Dagestan with the title "Агайхан" ("Agaykhan"), a famous plowman lives in a village with his three daughters. He earns his living by sowing the fields and harvesting the grain. One day, he goes to check on the fields and sees that a large snake surrounds it, "like a ring". The snake demands one of the man's daughters in marriage, otherwise it will destroy the fields. The man asks his three daughters if anyone offers herself to the snake, but only the youngest agrees to fulfill the snake's proposal. The man questions the snake about his daughter's fate, and it answers it will come in three days, build a splendid palace in front of his house, where they shall celebrate the wedding. The snake reveals a human shape and his name: Agaykhan. Some time later, her sisters come to visit her and become jealous of her good fortune. Inquiring about the snake husband, the girl reveals he sheds his snake skin to become a man. While they sweep the palace, the sisters find the snake skin and burn it. To the girl's horror, the snake husband disappears into a hole in the ground. She decides to venture into the hole to bring her husband back to the upper world. Down there, she reaches a fountain near a palace, where a young servant is fetching water. She drops her ring into the jug that is taken to Agaykhan and he recognizes the token. The prince takes the girl inside and reveals his past: he is the son of bloodthirsty Wakhig; he wanted to go to the upper world to find a bride there, but his mother tried to dissuade him, since no one would marry a snake. He then warns her that his mother will force her to perform difficult chores for her. First, Wakhig orders the girl to clean her house using needles. Agaykhan summons a wind to sweep the house. Next, she is to thatch the roof with bird feathers and to go behind the mountains to get a zurna and drums for Agaykhan's wedding to another bride. The snake husband advises her on all three tasks, but on the third the girl must drink from a river of blood and bile and praise it, to give hay to the horse and a bone to the dog, close an open door and open a closed one, get the instruments and escape. At last, Agaykhan's wedding happens, but he kills his second bride and escapes with the human wife by shapeshifting into pigeons.

Uzbekistan
In an Uzbek tale collected by folklorist Mansur Afzalov with the Uzbek title "Илон ога" (transliteration: "Ilon oga"), an old man lives with his wife and three daughters. One day, he plans to go to the market and asks his three daughters what he can bring them. The elder asks for a piece of satin, the middle one for a bridegroom, and the youngest for an apple. He finds the satin and a fiancé, but not the apple. A hermit tells the man to harvest in his garden an apple. The man goes to the hermit's orchard to get an apple, and a serpent coils around the tree. The animal asks the man to whom he plans to give the apple. The man says it is for his daughter, and the serpent asks for the man's daughter, for he will give a xurjin (a saddlebag) of apples. Thinking nothing of the deal, he agrees and gets a bag full of apples. Back home, the man and his family are greeted by the serpent's matchmakers, but the man refuses to give up his daughter. The matchmakers tell their master of the man's refusal, and the serpent promises to make the man and his family so poor he will have to give up his daughter. The serpent fulfills his promise and the man agrees to deliver his daughter to the serpent. The serpent is brought to the man's daughter under a cloth. Her mother cries over her youngest daughter's fate. After the matchmakers and the mother leave, the snake becomes a handsome youth and tells his bride to close every door and window, and warns her not to take out his snake scales from under the pillow, lest he disappears and she will have to seek him out with an iron cane, an iron veil and iron shoes. One of the women comes to the bride and convinces her to burn the snake scales. The maiden takes the scales and burns it in the fireplace. The serpent master smells the burning and reminds his bride of his warning, then turns into a moth and flies away. The maiden asks her father to prepare iron garments for her long, 40 days journey to find him. She passes by a herd of camels, a herd of horses and a herd of deers, and each servant tells her the herds belong to "Brother Snake". She reaches his house, but does not enter it, instead waiting by a fountain. A boy servant comes to fetch water, and tells the maiden the water is for his master, "Brother Snake". The maiden asks for a drink and tosses her ring into the jug. The boy servant takes the jug back to the serpent master, he finds the ring and goes outside. He warns his mother is "Baba-Yaga" (in the Russian translation), who may devour her, so he will hide his human bride into a chest before the witch comes. He also teaches her that his mother will ask her to go to his aunt to fetch some items to wash her hair. The serpent master does exactly that. His mother, "Baba Yaga", comes like a whirlwind and smells a human scent. The serpent master introduces his bride to her. The witch orders her human daughter-in-law to go to the witch's sister and fetch from there spoiled milk, a mirror, a comb, a bar and black and white threads. Following her husband's previous advice, the maiden eats a piece from a clay fence and compliments it, drinks a sip from a basin of foul water and compliments it, gently opens a gate, enters the aunt's palace and gives a bone to the dog and hay to the horse, and delouses his aunt. While the aunt is distracted, the maiden ties her hair to some trees, gets the items and flees. She meets her husband next to a horse and both escape. The aunt and the mother run after them, but the serpent master throws behind the spoiled milk to create an icy surface, a comb to create thickets, and a mirror to create a lake to delay them. From the other side of the lake, the aunt and the mother ask how the serpent master crossed it, and he says he put some stones in his clothes and swam. The witches follow his suggestion and drown. The serpent master and the maiden return home.

Turkey
Turkish folklorist  collected the tale Sır Saklamayan Padişah Kızı ("The Padishah's Daughter Who Cannot Keep a Secret") from the region of Gümüşhane, which was translated Into German by Adelheid Uzunoğlu-Ocherbauer as Die Prinzessin, die kein Geheimnis für sich behalten konnte ("The Princess who could not Keep a Secret"). In this tale, a poor couple have no children, and the old woman asks her husband to bring them a son, even if it is a snake. The old man earns their living by gathering firewood and selling it in the market. One day, the man brings home a bundle of firewood with a snake inside. Thanking God for having a son, the old couple feed and take care of the animal, and wherever the snake sleeps, a gold bar appears. Time passes, and the snake tells his father to go to the Sultan and ask for his eldest daughter in marriage with Mindilhava (the snake's name). The old man goes to the sultan's palace and sits on a stone reserved for suitors. The sultan takes the old man in and agrees with the proposal, but sets as a condition that a certain mountain must be moved next to the castle. Mindilhava fulfills the task; the sultan's eldest daughter is guided to a room, where she waits for her bridegroom: a snake comes into the room, but she returns to her father's palace. The sultan then says she should have waited a bit more. The snake then asks his father to go for the sultan's middle daughter; this time, the sultan orders that the river Tschoruh must flow next to his palace. The snake fulfills the second task; but the middle daughter also rejects her snake bridegroom. Finally, the snake asks for the sultan's youngest daughter, and this time he has to provide seven camels carrying loads of gold. The snake does and the third princess is guided to the room. She accepts the snake as her destiny, and shared the bed with the snake for three nights. On the fourth night, the snake takes off its skin and becomes a handsome youth, so handsome the sultan's daughter passes out. After six months, her elder sister suggests they invite their sister to see if she is still alive. The princess goes, and her father summons a jirit tournament, to which his snake son-in-law is invited. The snake, in human form, tells his wife he will take part in the festivities, but she must not tell anyone about his true identity. On the first day, he rides a fiery red horse with red clothes; on the second day, a black horse with black clothes; and on the third a white horse on white clothes. The princess's sisters mock her for her snake husband and admire the jirit rider, but on the third day she reveals the secret; a sudden storm rages and her husband disappears. She wears iron shoes and walks with an iron cane. On her journey, she meets a dervish who tells her she will reach a spring at the end of the way, where her husband's sister will come fetch water, and she must drop his ring on the water jug. It happens as the dervish advises: her husband recognizes the ring and goes to the fountain to get his wife. He explains that his mother is a Dev, with breasts fallen over her shoulders, so she should suckle his mother's breasts to avoid being devoured. His dev-mother believes the princess is just a girl who lost her way, and suggests to her son they should take her a goose-herd. Meanwhile, Mindilhava (the man) has been betrothed to his cousin, and the Dev-mother orders the princess to go to his aunt to fetch instruments for the upcoming wedding. Mindilhava advises his human wife to go there and fetch a sooty box over the stove, and flee as quickly as she can. The princess gets the box, but, on the way, she opens the box and the instruments escape. Mindilhava comes and orders the instruments to return to the box. Next, the Dev-mother orders the princess to fetch bird feathers for a blanket. Mindilhava takes the princess to the top of a mountain and summons all the birds for them to give their feathers. Lastly, during the wedding, the Dev-mother dips the princess's body in wax and places ten candles on her fingers, and takes her to Mindilhava's room. The princess utters to herself for her fingers to "burn with love" for Mindilhava, and he hears it. He takes the candles and places them in his cousin's fingers, then takes the princess, two razors and flees with her on a horse. His aunt chases after them, and the pair throws behind the razors to delay her. Next, his sister comes after them, and Mindilhava shapeshifts the princess into a tree and himself into a dervish to trick her. Lastly, his own Dev-mother goes after them; Mindilhava creates a lake and turns himself and the princess into ducks. The Dev-mother comes and asks the ducks how they got there, and the ducks answer that she should tie two millstones around her neck and swim. The Dev-mother does that and drowns. The princess and Mindilhava go back to the Sultan's realm.

See also
Graciosa and Percinet
The Green Serpent
The King of Love
Prunella
Ulv Kongesøn (Prince Wolf)
The Golden Root
The Horse-Devil and the Witch
Tulisa, the Wood-Cutter's Daughter
 Khastakhumar and Bibinagar
 La Fada Morgana
 The Son of the Ogress
 The Tale of the Woodcutter and his Daughters
Baemsillang (The Serpent Husband)
Amewakahiko soshi
 The Little Crab (Greek folktale)

References 

Iranian fairy tales
Persian fairy tales
Fictional princes
Male characters in fairy tales
Female characters in fairy tales
Fictional snakes
Fiction about shapeshifting
ATU 400-459